Antarctophthirus is a genus of lices belonging to the family Echinophthiriidae.

The species of this genus are found in arctic regions.

Species:

Antarctophthirus callorhini 
Antarctophthirus carlinii 
Antarctophthirus lobodontis 
Antarctophthirus mawsoni 
Antarctophthirus microchir 
Antarctophthirus ogmorhini 
Antarctophthirus trichechi

References

Lice